Mearns Castle High School is a secondary school situated on Waterfoot Road in Newton Mearns, East Renfrewshire, Scotland roughly seven miles from Glasgow. It was built in 1978, and pupils from Mearns Primary, Eaglesham Primary, Kirkhill Primary and Calderwood Lodge are all part of the school's catchment area.

Mearns Castle is situated next to Maxwell Mearns Church which hosts some Christian services for pupils. It is also positioned next to Mearns Castle (15th century), hence the name, "Mearns Castle High School".

Awards and recognition
The school's Senior Concert Band achieved significant success in the NCBF competitions achieving Gold Awards at both a Regional and National Level.

References

External links
 http://www.ea.e-renfrew.sch.uk/mearnscastle/aboutUs/welcome.asp (Mearns Castle High School Website)
Mearns Castle High School's page on Scottish Schools Online
http://www.timesonline.co.uk/parentpower/schools_of_the_year.php?p=scottish_state_secondary

Secondary schools in East Renfrewshire
Educational institutions established in 1978
1978 establishments in Scotland
Newton Mearns